Trechus gushensis is a species of ground beetle in the subfamily Trechinae.  It was described by Belousov & Kabak in 1998.

References

beetles described in 1998
gushensis